Ciarán Fitzgerald is an Irish film and television actor.

Early life and career 
Fitzgerald was born in Dublin, Ireland. He made his film debut in 1992 when he played the role of Ossie Reilly in Into the West, a film which he is perhaps best known for. He has appeared in several Irish films including Some Mother's Son, which stars Helen Mirren, The Last of the High Kings, which stars Jared Leto, Christina Ricci, Catherine O'Hara, and Gabriel Byrne, whom Fitzgerald had worked alongside in Into the West, The Boxer, which stars Daniel Day-Lewis and The General, which stars Brendan Gleeson, another actor which starred alongside Fitzgerald in Into the West.

Fitzgerald's television credits include Screen Two, The Hanging Gale and RTÉ One soap opera Fair City. He has appeared in two television films, The Canterville Ghost and The Informant.

Other work 
Fitzgerald performed on stage at The Helix, portraying Colin Craven from The Secret Garden on 8 January 2006. He studied drama in DIT Rathmines.

Filmography

References

External links 
 

1983 births
Film people from Dublin (city)
Irish male film actors
Irish male television actors
Irish male child actors
Living people